Tyneside Tramways and Tramroads Company operated an electric tramway service in Gosforth, Wallsend and North Shields between 1902 and 1930.

Overview

History
Tyneside Tramways and Tramroads Company built the electric tramway on the route of the Coxlodge Waggonway (which was also known as the Gosforth and Kenton Waggonway). It was authorised by the Tyneside Tramways and Tramroads Acts of 1901, 1902, and 1904.

At the western end, it connected with Newcastle Corporation Tramways. It had running powers over the Newcastle Corporation Tramways lines, and a reciprocal arrangements was had for Corporation cars on its tracks. Services started on 4 September 1902.

At the eastern end, it connected with the Tynemouth and District Electric Traction Company. However, the Tynemouth company tracks were of a different gauge, so through running was impossible. There was a short section of dual gauge track where the systems met, to allow cars from the different systems to meet for a convenient interchange of passengers.

The chairman of the company was John Theodore Merz. He was also a director of the Swan Electric Light Company. The Northern General Transport Company (a subsidiary of British Electric Traction took a controlling interest in the Tyneside Tramways and Tramroads Company in 1913.

Fleet
Car number 4 built in 1902 by G.F. Milnes & Co. was sold in 1930 to South Shields Corporation Tramways where it ran as No 46.

Closure
In 1920, the company applied for an act of parliament, enabling them to run omnibus services.

The tramway service closed on 6 April 1930 after which the company ran a motor bus service until 1975 as the Tyneside Omnibus Company

References

Tram transport in England